Battle of Niemen, Neman, Nemunas or the Niemen may refer to:
 Battle of Darsūniškis, Great Northern War, 1702
 French invasion of Russia, Napoleonic Wars, 1812
 Battle of Augustów (1914) (25–28 September), World War I
 Battle of the Niemen River, Polish-Soviet War, 1920
 Battle of the Niemen River (1944) (Vilnius Offensive), World War II, 1944

See also
 Battle of Grodno (disambiguation)
 Battle of Memel (disambiguation)